Saihou Jagne (born on 10 October 1986) is a Gambian professional footballer who plays as a striker and last played for Shillong Lajong FC in the I-League.
His nickname, CH, is an approximate Swedish pronunciation spelling of his given name. He also holds Swedish passport.

Career
Just a few weeks after signing with AIK, Turkish club Gaziantepspor showed interest in the young striker, making a bid up to €200,000.

He made his debut for AIK on 30 March 2008 in the first match of the new season as a substitute at Råsunda against Kalmar FF in a match that ended 0–0.

Jagne did not score once in the first months of his career at the club but when the team faced Kalmar FF for the second time of the season on 4 August 2008 he scored both goals for AIK in a game that ended 3–2 to Kalmar FF at Fredriksskans.

On 24 September he was substituted in the derby against arch-rivals Djurgårdens IF and scored the equaliser in stoppage time.

On 17 July 2014, it was announced that he had sign a contract with Ånge IF. He returned to Norway and Brumunddal in July 2015.

In May 2017 he joined the Indian club Fateh Hyderabad founded just two years ago. Jagne signed on a deal that would see him stay at the second-tier side until after the summer with an option to extend. He made his debut on 9 May 2017 in the home match of Fateh against Kenkre and scored a goal in the 19th minute.

He moved to Indian side Shillong Lajong F.C. in 2017.

Honours 
AIK
 Allsvenskan: 2009
 Svenska Cupen: 2009
 Supercupen: 2010

References

External links
Saihou Jagne at aikfotboll.se 

1986 births
Living people
Sportspeople from Banjul
Gambian footballers
Gambian emigrants to Sweden
Association football forwards
AIK Fotboll players
IFK Mariehamn players
GIF Sundsvall players
IF Brommapojkarna players
AFC Eskilstuna players
Hamarkameratene players
Shillong Lajong FC players
Allsvenskan players
Superettan players
Norwegian Second Division players
Veikkausliiga players
Gambian expatriate footballers
Gambian expatriates in Norway
Expatriate footballers in Norway
Gambian expatriate sportspeople in Sweden
Expatriate footballers in Sweden
Expatriate footballers in Finland
Expatriate footballers in India